Olsen Rock is a rock lying 0.5 nautical miles (0.9 km) southeast of Cape Paryadin, off the west end of South Georgia. Charted by DI personnel in 1926–27. Surveyed by the SGS in the period 1951–57, and named by the United Kingdom Antarctic Place-Names Committee (UK-APC) for Soren Olsen, gunner of the South Georgia Whaling Co. at Leith Harbor, 1926–30, 1933–39 and 1945–53.

Rock formations of South Georgia